The first senatorial elections of the Fifth Republic were held in France on April 26, 1959.

Context 
The Senate was created by constitution of the Fifth Republic to replace Council of the Republic. This election depend largely of the results of 1959 municipal elections.

Results

Senate Presidency 
On April 28, 1959, Gaston Monnerville a senator from Guyane was elected president of the Senate. Monnerville has been the highest-ranking black politician in French history, and if he was a candidate for reelection in 1968, he could have become the first black president of France the next year when President Pompidou died.

List of senators elected by region

References 

1959
1959 elections in France